Okie from Muskogee is the first live album by Merle Haggard and the Strangers released in October 1969 on Capitol Records.

Background

The album was a recorded performance at the Civic Center in Muskogee, Oklahoma on October 10, 1969, the day before the studio version of "Okie from Muskogee" hit the national country charts.

In the documentary Beyond Nashville, Haggard claims the song, which he wrote with drummer Eddie Burris on his bus, was more of a wistful tribute to his late father than any kind of political statement: "My dad passed away when I was nine, and I don't know if you've ever thought about somebody you've lost and you say, 'I wonder what so-and-so would think about this?' I was drivin' on Interstate 40 and I saw a sign that said "19 Miles to Muskogee", while at the same time listening to radio shows of The World Tomorrow hosted by Garner Ted Armstrong.  Muskogee was always referred to in my childhood as 'back home.' So I saw that sign and my whole childhood flashed before my eyes and I thought, 'I wonder what dad would think about the youthful uprising that was occurring at the time, the Janis Joplins...I understood 'em, I got a long with it, but what if he was to come alive at this moment? And I thought, what a way to describe the kind of people in America that are still sittin' in the center of the country sayin', 'What is goin' on on these campuses?'", as it was the subject of this Garner Ted Armstrong radio program.  "And a week or so later, I was listening to Garner Ted Armstrong, and Armstrong was saying how the smaller colleges in smaller towns don't seem to have any problems.  And I wondered if Muskogee had a college, and it did, and they hadn't had any trouble - no racial problems and no dope problems.  The whole thing hit me in two minutes, and I did one line after another and got the whole thing done in 20 minutes."  In the American Masters episode about his life and career, however, a more defiant Haggard states that the song was more than a satire: "That's how I got into it with the hippies...I thought they were unqualified to judge America, and I thought they were lookin' down their noses at something that I cherished very much, and it pissed me off. And I thought, 'You sons of bitches, you've never been restricted away from this great, wonderful country, and yet here you are in the streets bitchin' about things, protesting about a war that they didn't know anymore about than I did. They weren't over there fightin' that war anymore than I was."

Haggard began performing the song in concert in the fall of 1969 and was astounded at the reaction it received. As David Cantwell notes in his 2013 book Merle Haggard: The Running Kind, "The Haggard camp knew they were on to something. Everywhere they went, every show, "Okie" did more than prompt enthusiastic applause. There was an unanticipated adulation racing through the crowds now, standing ovations that went on and on and sometimes left the audience and the band-members alike teary-eyed. Merle had somehow stumbled upon a song that expressed previously inchoate fears, spoke out loud gripes and anxieties otherwise only whispered, and now people were using his song, were using him, to connect themselves to these larger concerns and to one another." The studio version topped the charts in the fall of 1969, where it remained for a month, and also hit number 41 on the pop charts, becoming Haggard's all-time biggest hit (until his 1973 crossover Christmas smash "If We Make It Through December")  and signature tune.

In Haggard's episode of CMT's Inside Fame, Brian Mansfield of USA Today insists, "I think between 1966 and 1969/1970, when he's doing "Okie from Muskogee" and "Fightin' Side of Me," that period was every bit the match of Hank Williams from about 1950 to 1952. I think it's that good..."

Critical reception

The album topped the Billboard country albums chart and hit number 46 on pop chart and won the Academy of Country Music award for Album of the Year in 1969. It also received the CMA Award for Album of the Year in 1970. Haggard also won Single of the Year for "Okie from Muskogee" as well as Top Male Vocalist.

Stephen Thomas Erlewine of AllMusic wrote, "While the record isn't necessary, it is a hell of a lot of fun and not bad evidence of why Hag was the most popular figure in country music at the end of the '60s." Music critic Robert Christgau wrote "Despite some slack performances, this album.. is a passable sampler.... But The Best of Merle Haggard is a lot more representative of a great iconoclast who's keeping it under wraps these days."

Track listing
All songs by Merle Haggard unless otherwise noted:

 "Introduction by Carlton Haney" –  :35
 "Mama Tried" – 2:25
 "No Hard Times" (Jimmie Rodgers) – 2:20
 "Silver Wings" – 2:39
 "Merle Receives Key to Muskogee" – 1:20
 "Merle's Introduction to Medley" – :23
 "Swinging Doors" – 1:16
 "I'm a Lonesome Fugitive" (Liz Anderson, Casey Anderson) – 1:37
 "Sing Me Back Home" – 1:24
 "Branded Man" – 2:18
 "In the Arms of Love" (Buck Owens, Gene Price) – 2:08
 "Workin' Man Blues" – 2:35
 "Merle's Introduction to "Hobo Bill"" – 1:07
 "Hobo Bill's Last Ride" (Waldo LaFayette O'Neal) – 2:38
 "Billy Overcame His Size" – 3:05
 "If I Had Left It Up to You" – 2:36
 "White Line Fever" – 3:03
 "Blue Rock" (Norman Hamlet, Roy Nichols) – 1:09
 "Introduction to Okie from Muskogee" – 1:47
 "Okie from Muskogee" (Merle Haggard, Eddie Burris) – 4:05

Personnel
Merle Haggard– vocals, guitar

The Strangers:
Roy Nichols – lead guitar
Norman Hamlet – steel guitar, dobro
Gene Price – bass, vocals
Eddie Burris – drums

with
Bonnie Owens – harmony vocals

Chart positions

References

Merle Haggard live albums
1969 live albums
Capitol Records live albums
Muskogee, Oklahoma